The south Pare white-eye (Zosterops winifredae) is a bird species in the family Zosteropidae. Its range is restricted to the southern region of the Pare Mountains in northeastern Tanzania.

The south Pare white-eye was formerly treated as a subspecies of the Heuglin's white-eye (Zosterops poliogastrus) (previously named montane white-eye) but it is now considered as a separate species based on the phylogenetic relationships determined in a molecular study published in 2014.

References

Zosterops
Birds described in 1934
Taxa named by William Lutley Sclater